Bad Moves is an American power pop band from Washington, D.C. They were formed in 2015, and are currently on Don Giovanni Records. The band consists of David Combs (The Max Levine Ensemble, Spoonboy, Somnia, Dim Wizard), Katie Park (Hemlines), Daoud Tyler-Ameen (Art Sorority) and Emma Cleveland.

History
Bad Moves released a self-titled debut EP in 2016 on Don Giovanni Records. In May 2017 they supported Scottish band The Spook School on a partial UK tour. In mid to late April and early May 2018 they, along with Martha of England, supported Jeff Rosenstock for the Northeastern and Midwestern leg of his US tour.

They went on to record their first full-length album Tell No One at Philadelphia's Headroom Studio with Joe Reinhart of Hop Along. This was released September 21, 2018, also on Don Giovanni Records, after which the band toured with The Obsessives, Nana Grizol, and Lee Bains III and the Glory Fires.

On July 9, 2018, the band guest-starred in "Vulture's Nest", an episode of the Cartoon Network animated series Craig of the Creek.

Half the band have volunteered at rock music youth coaching programs. Combs volunteered for a few summers at Queer Rock Camp in Olympia, Washington, and Park has been a band coach and worked with Girls Rock! DC.

On April 7, 2020, the band announced their second album Untenable, again on Don Giovanni, would be released later that spring. They simultaneously revealed the first single from it, "Party with the Kids Who Wanna Party with You".

Personnel
Emma Cleveland: Bass, Vocals
David Combs: Guitar, Vocals
Katie Park: Guitar, Vocals
Daoud Tyler-Ameen: Drums, Vocals

Discography

Studio albums
 Tell No One (Don Giovanni Records) (2018)
 Untenable (Don Giovanni Records) (2020)

EPs
 Bad Moves (Don Giovanni Records) (2016)

Singles
 "Cool Generator" (Don Giovanni Records) (2018)
 "One Thing"      (Don Giovanni Records) (2018)
 "Spirit FM"      (Don Giovanni Records) (2018)
 "Crushed Out"    (Don Giovanni Records) (2018)
 "Party With The Kids Who Wanna Party With You" (Don Giovanni Records) (2020)

References

Musical groups from Washington, D.C.
Don Giovanni Records artists